The 2020 NHL Entry Draft was the 58th NHL Entry Draft, held from October 6–7, 2020. The draft was originally scheduled for June 26–27, 2020, at the Bell Centre in Montreal, Quebec, but was postponed on March 25, 2020, due to the COVID-19 pandemic. The event was held in a remote format, with teams convening via videoconferencing, and Commissioner Gary Bettman announcing the selections in the opening round and deputy commissioner Bill Daly in all subsequent rounds from the NHL Network studios in Secaucus, New Jersey.

The first three selections were Alexis Lafreniere going to the New York Rangers, Quinton Byfield being selected by the Los Angeles Kings, and Tim Stuetzle being picked by the Ottawa Senators.

Eligibility
Ice hockey players born between January 1, 2000, and September 15, 2002, were eligible for selection in the 2020 NHL Entry Draft. Additionally, un-drafted, non-North American players born in 1999 were eligible for the draft; and those players who were drafted in the 2018 NHL Entry Draft, but not signed by an NHL team and who were born after June 30, 2000, were also eligible to re-enter the draft.

Draft lottery

First phase

The first three picks overall in this draft were awarded by lottery. Since the 2012–13 NHL season all teams not qualifying for the Stanley Cup playoffs have a "weighted" chance at winning the first overall selection. Beginning with the 2014–15 NHL season the NHL changed the weighting system that was used in previous years. Under the new system the odds of winning the draft lottery for the four lowest finishing teams in the league decreased, while the odds for the other non-playoff teams increased.

Due to the COVID-19 pandemic, the 2019–20 regular season was cut short after it was suspended on March 12, 2020. The league then implemented a special 24-team format for the 2020 Stanley Cup playoffs that included an additional Qualifying Round. The NHL also wanted to hold the draft lottery before the playoffs began on August 1, 2020, while at the same time keeping its 15-team draft lottery system. It was decided that the draft lottery would include the seven teams that did not qualify for the playoffs, and eight placeholders representing the yet-to-be-determined clubs eliminated in the Qualifying Round.

The first phase of the draft lottery was held on June 26, 2020. The first overall pick was won by "Team E", one of the placeholders. As a result, the league conducted a second draft lottery on August 10, 2020, while the Los Angeles Kings moved up two spots and the Ottawa Senators (previously acquired from San Jose) remained at third overall. In the process, the Detroit Red Wings and Ottawa Senators moved down three spots from first and second overall, respectively, while the Anaheim Ducks, New Jersey Devils and Buffalo Sabres each dropped one spot.

{| class="wikitable"
|+ Complete draft position odds
! Team
! 1st
! 2nd
! 3rd
! 4th
! 5th
! 6th
! 7th
! 8th
! 9th
! 10th
! 11th
! 12th
! 13th
! 14th
! 15th
|-
! Detroit
| 18.5% || 16.5% || 14.4% ||style="background:#DDDDDD;"| 50.6% || || || || || || || || || || ||
|-
! Ottawa
| 13.5% || 13.0% || 12.3% || 33.3% ||style="background:#DDDDDD;"| 27.9% || || || || || || || || || ||
|-
! San Jose
| 11.5% || 11.3% ||style="background:#F3F781;"| 11.1% || 13.2% || 37.7% || 15.2% || || || || || || || || ||
|-
! Los Angeles
| 9.5% ||style="background:#F5A9BC;"| 9.6% || 9.7% || 2.8% || 26.1% || 34.0% || 8.3% || || || || || || || ||
|-
! Anaheim
| 8.5% || 8.7% || 8.9% || || 8.4% ||style="background:#DDDDDD;"| 34.5% || 26.7% || 4.3% || || || || || || ||
|-
! New Jersey
| 7.5% || 7.8% || 8.0% || || || 16.3% ||style="background:#DDDDDD;"| 38.9% || 19.4% || 2.1% || || || || || ||
|-
! Buffalo
| 6.5% || 6.8% || 7.1% || || || || 26.0% ||style="background:#DDDDDD;"| 39.5% || 13.1% || 1.0% || || || || ||
|-
! Team A
| 6.0% || 6.3% || 6.7% || || || || || 36.8% || 36.0% || 7.8% || 0.4% || || || ||
|-
! Team B
| 5.0% || 5.3% || 5.7% || || || || || || 48.8% || 30.7% || 4.3% || 0.1% || || ||
|-
! Team C
| 3.5% || 3.8% || 4.1% || || || || || || || 60.5% || 25.7% || 2.4% || <0.1% || ||
|-
! Team D
| 3.0% || 3.3% || 3.6% || || || || || || || || 69.6% || 19.4% || 1.1% || <0.1% ||
|-
! Team E
|style="background:#A9D0F5;"| 2.5% || 2.7% || 3.0% || || || || || || || || || 78.0% || 13.3% || 0.4% || <0.1%
|-
! Team F
| 2.0% || 2.2% || 2.4% || || || || || || || || || || 85.5% || 7.8% || 0.1%
|-
! Team G
| 1.5% || 1.7% || 1.8% || || || || || || || || || || || 91.8% || 3.2%
|-
! Team H
| 1.0% || 1.1% || 1.2% || || || || || || || || || || || || 96.7%
|}

Second phase

Because a placeholder team won the initial draft lottery, a second lottery took place on August 10. The second phase of the lottery gave all eight teams eliminated in the Qualifying Round of the 2020 Stanley Cup playoffs an equal chance to win the first overall pick. This guaranteed that a team that made the playoffs would select first overall in draft for the first time since 1983. Each eliminated team had one lottery ball; the seven teams that did not win the second draft lottery were assigned picks nine through fifteen based on inverse order of points percentage. The New York Rangers won phase two of the draft lottery and moved up nine spots in the draft order to earn the first selection in the draft.

{| class="wikitable"
|+ Odds at first selection
! Team
! 1st
|-
! Edmonton
| 12.5%
|-
! Florida
| 12.5%
|-
! Minnesota
| 12.5%
|-
! Nashville
| 12.5%
|-
! NY Rangers
| style="background:#A9D0F5;"|12.5%
|-
! Pittsburgh
| 12.5%
|-
! Toronto
| 12.5%
|-
! Winnipeg
| 12.5%
|}

Top prospects
Source: NHL Central Scouting final (April 8, 2020) ranking.

Selections by round
The order of the 2020 Entry Draft is listed below.

Round one

Notes
 The San Jose Sharks' first-round pick went to the Ottawa Senators as the result of a trade on September 13, 2018, that sent Erik Karlsson and Francis Perron to San Jose in exchange for Chris Tierney, Dylan DeMelo, Josh Norris, Rudolfs Balcers, a conditional second-round pick in 2019, a conditional first-round pick in 2021, a conditional first-round pick no later than 2022 and this pick (being conditional at the time of the trade). The condition – Ottawa will receive a first-round pick in 2020 if San Jose qualifies for the 2019 Stanley Cup playoffs – was converted on March 19, 2019.
 The Toronto Maple Leafs' first-round pick went to the Carolina Hurricanes as the result of a trade on June 22, 2019, that sent a sixth-round pick in 2020 to Toronto in exchange for Patrick Marleau, a seventh-round pick in 2020 and this pick (being conditional at the time of the trade). The condition – Carolina will receive a first-round pick in 2020 if Toronto's first-round pick in 2020 is outside of the top ten selections – was converted on August 10, 2020, when Toronto lost the second phase of the draft lottery.
 The Pittsburgh Penguins' first-round pick went to the Toronto Maple Leafs as the result of a trade on August 25, 2020, that sent Kasperi Kapanen, Pontus Aberg and Jesper Lindgren to Pittsburgh in exchange for Evan Rodrigues, Filip Hallander, David Warsofsky and this pick.
 The Arizona Coyotes' first-round pick went to the New Jersey Devils as the result of a trade on December 16, 2019, that sent Taylor Hall and Blake Speers to Arizona in exchange for Nick Merkley, Kevin Bahl, Nate Schnarr, a conditional third-round pick in 2021 and this pick (being conditional at the time of the trade). The condition – New Jersey will receive a first-round pick in 2020 if Arizona's pick is outside the top three - was converted when the Coyotes advanced to the First Round of the 2020 Stanley Cup playoffs on August 7, 2020.
 The Calgary Flames' first-round pick went to the New York Rangers as the result of a trade on October 6, 2020, that sent Carolina's first-round pick and a third-round pick both in 2020 (22nd and 72nd overall) to Calgary in exchange for this pick.
 The Vancouver Canucks' first-round pick went to the New Jersey Devils as the result of a trade on February 16, 2020, that sent Blake Coleman to Tampa Bay in exchange for Nolan Foote and this pick (being conditional at the time of the trade). The condition – New Jersey will receive a first-round pick in 2020 if Vancouver qualifies for the 2020 Stanley Cup playoffs – was converted when the Canucks advanced to the First Round of the playoffs on August 7, 2020.
Tampa Bay previously acquired this pick in a trade on June 22, 2019, that sent J. T. Miller to Vancouver in exchange for Marek Mazanec, a third-round pick in 2019 and this pick.
 The Carolina Hurricanes' first-round pick went to the Washington Capitals as the result of a trade on October 6, 2020, that sent a first-round pick and Arizona's third-round both in 2020 (24th and 80th overall) to Calgary in exchange for this pick.
Calgary previously acquired this pick as the result of a trade on October 6, 2020, that sent a first-round pick in 2020 (19th overall) to New York in exchange for a third-round pick in 2020 (72nd overall) and this pick.
The Rangers previously acquired this pick as the result of a trade on February 24, 2020, that sent Brady Skjei to Carolina in exchange for this pick (being conditional at the time of the trade). The condition – New York will receive the later of Carolina or Toronto's first-round pick in 2020 if Carolina acquires the Maple Leafs' first-round pick in 2020. Otherwise New York will receive the Hurricanes' first-round pick in 2020. – was converted when the Maple Leafs were eliminated from the 2020 Stanley Cup playoffs on August 9, 2020.
 The Washington Capitals' first-round pick went to the Calgary Flames as the result of a trade on October 6, 2020, that sent Carolina's first-round pick in 2020 (22nd overall) to Washington in exchange for Arizona's third-round pick in 2020 (80th overall) and this pick.
 The Boston Bruins' first-round pick went to the Anaheim Ducks as the result of a trade on February 21, 2020, that sent Ondrej Kase to Boston in exchange for David Backes, Axel Andersson and this pick.
 The New York Islanders' first-round pick went to the Ottawa Senators as the result of a trade on February 24, 2020, that sent Jean-Gabriel Pageau to New York in exchange for a second-round pick in 2020, a conditional third-round pick in 2022 and this pick (being conditional at the time of the trade). The condition – Ottawa will receive a first-round pick in 2020 if New York's first-round pick is outside the top three selections – was converted when the Islanders advanced to the First Round of the 2020 Stanley Cup playoffs on August 7, 2020.
 The Tampa Bay Lightning's first-round pick went to the San Jose Sharks as the result of a trade on February 24, 2020, that sent Barclay Goodrow and Philadelphia's third-round pick in 2020 to Tampa Bay in exchange for Anthony Greco and this pick.

Round two

Notes
 The San Jose Sharks' second-round pick went to the Buffalo Sabres as the result of a trade on October 7, 2020, that sent a second and fourth-round pick both in 2020 (38th and 100th overall) to San Jose in exchange for this pick.
 The New Jersey Devils' second-round pick went to the Minnesota Wild as the result of a trade on October 7, 2020, that sent Luke Kunin and a fourth-round pick in 2020 (101st overall) to Nashville in exchange for Nick Bonino, Minnesota's third-round pick in 2020 (70th overall) and this pick.
Nashville previously acquired this pick as the result of a trade on June 22, 2019, that sent P. K. Subban to New Jersey in exchange for Steven Santini, Jeremy Davies, a second-round pick in 2019 and this pick.
 The Buffalo Sabres' second-round pick went to the San Jose Sharks as the result of a trade on October 7, 2020, that sent a second-round pick in 2020 (34th overall) to Buffalo in exchange for a fourth-round pick in 2020 (100th overall) and this pick.
 The New York Rangers' second-round pick went to the Carolina Hurricanes as the result of a trade on April 30, 2019, that sent Adam Fox to New York in exchange for a second-round pick in 2019 and this pick (being conditional at the time of the trade). The condition – Carolina will receive a second-round pick in 2020 if Fox plays in at least 30 games during the 2019–20 NHL season – was converted on December 10, 2019.
 The Toronto Maple Leafs' second-round pick went to the Ottawa Senators as the result of a trade on October 7, 2020, that sent the Islanders' second-round pick and a third-round pick both in 2020 (59th and 64th overall) to Toronto in exchange for this pick.
 The Edmonton Oilers' second-round pick went to the Los Angeles Kings as the result of a trade on October 7, 2020, that sent Vancouver's second-round pick and a fourth-round pick both in 2020 (51st and 97th overall) to Detroit in exchange for this pick.
Detroit previously acquired this pick as the result of a trade on February 24, 2020, that sent Andreas Athanasiou and Ryan Kuffner to Edmonton in exchange for Sam Gagner, a second-round pick in 2021 and this pick.
 The Pittsburgh Penguins' second-round pick went to the Chicago Blackhawks as the result of a trade on February 24, 2020, that sent Martins Dzierkals to Vegas in exchange for Malcolm Subban, Stanislav Demin and this pick.
Vegas previously acquired this pick as the result of a trade on June 21, 2017, that ensured that Vegas selected Marc-Andre Fleury in the 2017 NHL Expansion Draft from Pittsburgh in exchange for this pick.
 The Chicago Blackhawks' second-round pick went to the Montreal Canadiens as the result of a trade on June 30, 2019, that sent Andrew Shaw and a seventh-round pick in 2021 to Chicago in exchange for a seventh-round pick in 2020, a third-round pick in 2021 and this pick.
 The Arizona Coyotes' second-round pick in 2020 was forfeited as the result of a penalty sanction due to violations of the NHL Combine Testing Policy during the 2019–20 NHL season. The penalty includes the forfeiture of a first-round pick in 2021.
 The Vancouver Canucks' second-round pick went to the Detroit Red Wings as the result of a trade on October 7, 2020, that sent Edmonton's second-round pick in 2020 (45th overall) to Los Angeles in exchange for a fourth-round pick in 2020 (97th overall) and this pick.
Los Angeles previously acquired this pick as the result of a trade on February 17, 2020, that sent Tyler Toffoli to Vancouver in exchange for Tim Schaller, Tyler Madden, a conditional fourth-round pick in 2022 and this pick.
 The Columbus Blue Jackets' second-round pick went to the Pittsburgh Penguins as the result of a trade October 7, 2020, that sent Matt Murray to Ottawa in exchange for Jonathan Gruden and this pick.
Ottawa previously acquired this pick as the result of a trade on February 23, 2019, that sent Ryan Dzingel and Calgary's seventh-round pick in 2019 to Columbus in exchange for Anthony Duclair, a second-round pick in 2021 and this pick.
 The Washington Capitals' second-round pick went to the Detroit Red Wings as the result of a trade on February 22, 2019, that sent Nick Jensen and Buffalo's fifth-round pick in 2019 to Washington in exchange for Madison Bowey and this pick.
 The Colorado Avalanche's second-round pick went to the San Jose Sharks as the result of a trade on February 18, 2020, that sent Brenden Dillon to Washington in exchange for a conditional third-round pick in 2021 and this pick.
 Washington previously acquired this pick as the result of a trade on June 28, 2019, that sent Andre Burakovsky to Colorado in exchange for Scott Kosmachuk, Arizona's third-round pick in 2020 and this pick.
 The St. Louis Blues' second-round pick went to the Tampa Bay Lightning as the result of a trade on October 7, 2020, that sent a fourth-round pick in 2020 (124th overall) and a second-round pick in 2021 to Montreal in exchange for this pick.
Montreal previously acquired this pick as the result of a trade on February 18, 2020, that sent Marco Scandella to St. Louis in exchange for a conditional fourth-round pick in 2021 and this pick.
 The New York Islanders' second-round pick went to the Toronto Maple Leafs as the result of a trade on October 7, 2020, that sent a second-round pick in 2020 (44th overall) to Ottawa in exchange for a third-round pick in 2020 (64th overall) and this pick.
Ottawa previously acquired this pick as the result of a trade on February 24, 2020, that sent Jean-Gabriel Pageau to New York in exchange for a conditional first-round pick in 2020, a conditional third-round pick in 2022 and this pick.
 The Vegas Golden Knights' second-round pick went to the New York Rangers as the result of a trade on October 7, 2020, that sent Lias Andersson to Los Angeles in exchange for this pick.
Los Angeles previously acquired this pick as the result of a trade on February 19, 2020, that sent Alec Martinez to Vegas in exchange for St. Louis' second-round pick in 2021 and this pick.
 The Dallas Stars' second-round pick went to the Ottawa Senators as the result of a trade on February 25, 2019, that sent Mark Stone and Tobias Lindberg to Vegas in exchange for Erik Brannstrom, Oscar Lindberg and this pick.
Vegas previously acquired this pick as the result of a trade on June 26, 2017, that sent Marc Methot to Dallas in exchange for Dylan Ferguson and this pick.

Round three

Notes
 The Ottawa Senators' third-round pick went to the Toronto Maple Leafs as the result of a trade on October 7, 2020, that sent a second-round pick in 2020 (44th overall) to Ottawa in exchange for the Islanders' second-round pick in 2020 (59th overall) and this pick.
 The San Jose Sharks' third-round pick went to the Minnesota Wild as the result of a trade on October 7, 2020, that sent a third and fifth-round pick both in 2020 (70th and 132nd overall) to Detroit in exchange for this pick.
Detroit previously acquired this pick as the result of a trade on February 24, 2019, that sent Gustav Nyquist to San Jose in exchange for a conditional second-round pick in 2019 and this pick (being conditional at the time of the trade). The condition – Detroit will receive a third-round pick in 2020 if Nyquist does not re-sign with San Jose for the 2019–20 NHL season – was converted when Nyquist signed with Columbus on July 1, 2019.
 The New Jersey Devils' third-round pick went to the Vegas Golden Knights as the result of a trade on July 29, 2019, that sent Nikita Gusev to New Jersey in exchange for a second-round pick in 2021 and this pick.
 The Buffalo Sabres' third-round pick went to the Carolina Hurricanes as the result of a trade on August 2, 2018, that sent Jeff Skinner to Buffalo in exchange for Cliff Pu, a second-round pick in 2019, a sixth-round pick in 2020 and this pick.
 The Minnesota Wild's third-round pick went to the Detroit Red Wings as the result of a trade on October 7, 2020, that sent San Jose's third-round pick in 2020 (65th overall) to Minnesota in exchange for a fifth-round pick in 2020 (132nd overall) and this pick.
Minnesota previously re-acquired this pick as the result of a trade on October 7, 2020, that sent Luke Kunin and a fourth-round pick in 2020 (101st overall) to Nashville in exchange for Nick Bonino, New Jersey's second-round pick in 2020 (37th overall) and this pick.
Nashville previously acquired this pick as the result of a trade on June 22, 2019, that sent Florida's third-round pick in 2019 to Minnesota in exchange for this pick.
 The Winnipeg Jets' third-round pick went to the Ottawa Senators as the result of a trade on February 18, 2020, that sent Dylan DeMelo to Winnipeg in exchange for this pick.
 The New York Rangers' third-round pick went to the Calgary Flames as the result of a trade on October 6, 2020, that sent a first-round pick in 2020 (19th overall) to the New York in exchange for Carolina's first-round pick in 2020 (22nd overall) and this pick.
 The Toronto Maple Leafs' third-round pick went to the Colorado Avalanche as the result of a trade on July 1, 2019, that sent Tyson Barrie, Alexander Kerfoot and a sixth-round pick in 2020 to Toronto in exchange for Nazem Kadri, Calle Rosen and this pick.
 The Edmonton Oilers' third-round pick went to the San Jose Sharks as the result of a trade on October 7, 2020, that sent Buffalo's fourth-round pick and Ottawa's fifth-round pick both in 2020 (100th and 126th overall) to Edmonton in exchange for this pick.
 The Montreal Canadiens' third-round pick went to the Columbus Blue Jackets as the result of a trade on October 6, 2020, that sent Josh Anderson to Montreal in exchange for Max Domi and this pick.
 The Arizona Coyotes' third-round pick went to the Calgary Flames as the result of a trade on October 6, 2020, that sent Carolina's first-round pick in 2020 (22nd overall) to Washington in exchange for a first-round pick in 2020 (24th overall) and this pick.
Washington previously acquired this pick as the result of a trade on June 28, 2019, that sent Andre Burakovsky to Colorado in exchange for Scott Kosmachuk, a second-round pick in 2020 and this pick.
Colorado previously acquired this pick as the result of a trade on June 25, 2019, that sent Carl Soderberg to Arizona in exchange for Kevin Connauton and this pick.
 The Calgary Flames' third-round pick went to the Chicago Blackhawks as the result of a trade on February 24, 2020, that sent Erik Gustafsson to Calgary in exchange for this pick (being conditional at the time of the trade). The condition – Chicago will receive the higher of Calgary or Edmonton's third-round pick in 2020 if Calgary acquires the Oilers' third-round pick in 2020 – was converted when the Oilers elected to keep their third-round pick in 2020 on October 7, 2020.
 The Columbus Blue Jackets' third-round pick went to the Los Angeles Kings as the result of a trade on February 5, 2020, that sent Jack Campbell and Kyle Clifford to Toronto in exchange for Trevor Moore, a conditional third-round pick in 2021 and this pick.
Toronto previously acquired this pick as the result of a trade on July 1, 2019, that sent Nikita Zaitsev, Connor Brown and Michael Carcone to Ottawa in exchange for Cody Ceci, Ben Harpur, Aaron Luchuk and this pick.
Ottawa previously acquired this pick as the result of a trade on February 26, 2018, that sent Ian Cole to Columbus in exchange for Nick Moutrey and this pick.
 The Carolina Hurricanes' third-round pick went to the New Jersey Devils as the result of a trade on February 24, 2020, that sent Sami Vatanen to Carolina in exchange for Fredrik Claesson, Janne Kuokkanen and this pick (being conditional at the time of the trade). The condition – New Jersey will receive a third-round pick in 2020 if Vatanen plays in 70% of the Hurricanes' playoff games after the 2020 Eastern Conference Qualifying Round – was converted after Vatanen played in four of the five games for Carolina during the 2020 Eastern Conference First Round that ended with the Hurricanes being eliminated on August 19, 2020.
 The Philadelphia Flyers' third-round pick went to the Tampa Bay Lightning as the result of a trade on February 24, 2020, that sent Anthony Greco and a first-round pick in 2020 to San Jose in exchange for Barclay Goodrow and this pick.
San Jose previously acquired this pick as the result of a trade on June 18, 2019, that sent Justin Braun to Philadelphia in exchange for a second-round pick in 2019 and this pick.
 The Washington Capitals' third-round pick went to the St. Louis Blues as the result of a trade on September 2, 2020, that sent Jake Allen and a seventh-round pick in 2022 to Montreal in exchange for Chicago's seventh-round pick in 2020 and this pick.
Montreal previously acquired this pick as the result of a trade on February 23, 2020, that sent Ilya Kovalchuk to Washington in exchange for this pick.
 The Colorado Avalanche's third-round pick went to the Florida Panthers as the result of a trade on February 25, 2019, that sent Derick Brassard and a conditional sixth-round pick in 2020 to Colorado in exchange for this pick.
 The Dallas Stars' third-round pick went to the New York Rangers as the result of a trade on February 23, 2019, that sent Mats Zuccarello to Dallas in exchange for a conditional second-round pick in 2019 and this pick (being conditional at the time of the trade). The condition – New York will receive a third-round pick in 2020 if Zuccarello does not re-sign with Dallas for the 2019–20 NHL season – was converted when Zuccarello signed with Minnesota on July 1, 2019.

Round four

Notes
 The Detroit Red Wings' fourth-round pick went to the Philadelphia Flyers as the result of a trade on October 7, 2020, that sent a fourth and fifth-round pick both in 2020 (116th and 147th overall) to Tampa Bay in exchange for this pick.
Tampa Bay previously acquired this pick as the result of a trade on August 14, 2019, that sent Adam Erne to Detroit in exchange for this pick.
 The Ottawa Senators' fourth-round pick went to the Florida Panthers as the result of a trade on October 2, 2020, that sent Josh Brown to Ottawa in exchange for this pick.
 The San Jose Sharks' fourth-round pick went to the Calgary Flames as the result of a trade on January 2, 2020, that sent Michael Frolik to Buffalo in exchange for this pick. 
Buffalo previously acquired this pick as the result of a trade on January 2, 2020, that sent Marco Scandella to Montreal in exchange for this pick.
Montreal previously acquired this pick as the result of a trade on June 22, 2019, that sent a fourth-round pick in 2019 to San Jose in exchange for this pick.
 The Los Angeles Kings' fourth-round pick went to the Detroit Red Wings as the result of a trade on October 7, 2020, that sent Edmonton's second-round pick in 2020 (45th overall) to Los Angeles in exchange for Vancouver's second-round pick in 2020 (51st overall) and this pick.
 The Anaheim Ducks' fourth-round pick went to the San Jose Sharks as the result of a trade on October 7, 2020, that sent Washington's third-round pick in 2021 to Montreal in exchange for this pick.
Montreal previously acquired this pick as the result of a trade on June 30, 2019, that sent Nicolas Deslauriers to Anaheim in exchange for this pick.
 The Buffalo Sabres' fourth-round pick went to the Edmonton Oilers as the result of a trade on October 7, 2020, that sent a third-round pick in 2020 (76th overall) to San Jose in exchange for Ottawa's fifth-round pick in 2020 (126th overall) and this pick.
San Jose previously acquired this pick as the result of a trade on October 7, 2020, that sent a second-round pick in 2020 (34th overall) to Buffalo in exchange for a second-round pick in 2020 (38th overall) and this pick.
 The Minnesota Wild's fourth-round pick went to the Nashville Predators as the result of a trade on October 7, 2020, that sent Nick Bonino, New Jersey's second-round pick and a third-round pick both in 2020 (37th and 70th overall) to Minnesota in exchange for Luke Kunin and this pick.
 The Winnipeg Jets' fourth-round pick went to the Montreal Canadiens as the result of a trade on June 30, 2018, that sent Simon Bourque to Winnipeg in exchange for Steve Mason, Joel Armia, a seventh-round pick in 2019 and this pick.
 The Nashville Predators' fourth-round pick went to the Anaheim Ducks as the result of a trade on February 24, 2020, that sent Derek Grant to Philadelphia in exchange for Kyle Criscuolo and this pick (being conditional at the time of the trade). The condition – Anaheim will receive the higher of Nashville or Philadelphia's fourth-round pick in 2020. – was converted when Nashville was eliminated from the 2020 Stanley Cup playoffs on August 7, 2020, ensuring that Nashville would select higher than Philadelphia.
Philadelphia previously acquired this pick as the result of a trade on February 25, 2019, that sent Wayne Simmonds to Nashville in exchange for Ryan Hartman and this pick (being conditional at the time of the trade). The condition – Philadelphia will receive a fourth-round pick in 2020 if Nashville does not advance to the 2019 Western Conference Second Round – was converted on April 22, 2019 when Nashville was eliminated from the 2019 Stanley Cup playoffs.
 The Edmonton Oilers' fourth-round pick went to the Detroit Red Wings as the result of a trade on February 23, 2020, that sent Mike Green to Edmonton in exchange for Kyle Brodziak and this pick (being conditional at the time of the trade). The condition – Detroit will receive a fourth-round pick in 2020 if Green does not play in at least 50% of the Oilers' 2020 Stanley Cup playoff games. – was converted on July 11, 2020, when Green informed the Oilers he would not participate in the 2020 Stanley Cup playoffs.
 The Calgary Flames' fourth-round pick went to the Los Angeles Kings as the result of a trade on February 25, 2019, that sent Oscar Fantenberg to Calgary in exchange for this pick (being conditional at the time of the trade). The condition – Los Angeles will receive a fourth-round pick in 2020 if Calgary does not advance to the 2019 Western Conference Finals – was converted on April 19, 2019 when Calgary was eliminated from the 2019 Stanley Cup playoffs.
 The Philadelphia Flyers' fourth-round pick went to the Tampa Bay Lightning as the result of a trade on October 7, 2020, that sent Detroit's fourth-round pick in 2020 (94th overall) to Philadelphia in exchange for a fifth-round pick in 2020 (147th overall) and this pick.
 The Boston Bruins' fourth-round pick went to the New Jersey Devils as the result of a trade on February 25, 2019, that sent Marcus Johansson to Boston in exchange for a second-round pick in 2019 and this pick.
 The Vegas Golden Knights' fourth-round pick went to the Toronto Maple Leafs as the result of a trade on July 23, 2019, that sent Garret Sparks to Vegas in exchange for David Clarkson and this pick.
 The Tampa Bay Lightning's fourth-round pick went to the Montreal Canadiens as the result of a trade on October 7, 2020, that sent St. Louis' second-round pick in 2020 (57th overall) to Tampa Bay in exchange for a second-round pick in 2021 and this pick.

Round five

Notes
 The Detroit Red Wings' fifth-round pick went to the Vegas Golden Knights as the result of a trade on October 7, 2020, that sent a fourth-round pick in 2022 to Detroit in exchange for this pick.
 The Ottawa Senators' fifth-round pick went to the Edmonton Oilers as the result of a trade on October 7, 2020, that sent a third-round pick in 2020 (76th overall) to San Jose in exchange for Buffalo's fourth-round pick in 2020 (100th overall) and this pick.
San Jose previously acquired this pick as the result of a trade on June 19, 2018, that sent Mikkel Boedker, Julius Bergman and a sixth-round pick in 2020 to Ottawa in exchange for Mike Hoffman, Cody Donaghey and this pick.
 The San Jose Sharks' fifth-round pick went to the New York Rangers as the result of a trade on October 7, 2020, that sent a seventh-round pick and Vancouver's seventh-round pick both in 2020 (196th and 206th overall) to San Jose in exchange for this pick.
 The Minnesota Wild's fifth-round pick went to the Detroit Red Wings as the result of a trade on October 7, 2020, that sent San Jose's third-round pick in 2020 (65th overall) to Minnesota in exchange for a third-round pick in 2020 (70th overall) and this pick.
 The Nashville Predators' fifth-round pick went to the Philadelphia Flyers as the result of a trade on October 7, 2020, that sent a seventh-round pick and Montreal's seventh-round pick both in 2020 (202nd and 209th overall) to San Jose in exchange for this pick.
 The Florida Panthers' fifth-round pick went to the Montreal Canadiens as the result of a trade on June 22, 2019, that sent Chicago's fifth-round pick in 2019 to Florida in exchange for this pick.
 The Toronto Maple Leafs' fifth-round pick was re-acquired as the result of a trade on October 7, 2020, that sent Vegas' fifth-round pick and St. Louis' seventh-round pick both in 2020 (153rd and 212th overall) to Florida in exchange for this pick.
Florida previously acquired this pick as the result of a trade on December 29, 2018, that sent Michael Hutchinson to Toronto in exchange for this pick.
 The Pittsburgh Penguins' fifth-round pick went to the Colorado Avalanche as the result of a trade on October 7, 2020, that sent a fifth and seventh-round pick both in 2020 (149th and 211th overall) to Pittsburgh in exchange for this pick.
 The Montreal Canadiens fifth-round pick went to the Los Angeles Kings as the result of a trade on October 7, 2020, that sent a sixth-round pick in 2020 (159th overall) and a seventh-round pick in 2021 to Carolina in exchange for this pick.
Carolina previously acquired this pick as the result of a trade on September 12, 2020, that sent Joel Edmundson to Montreal in exchange for this pick.
 The Carolina Hurricanes' fifth-round pick went to the Minnesota Wild as the result of a trade on October 7, 2020, that sent a sixth and seventh-round pick both in 2020 (163rd and 194th overall) to St. Louis in exchange for this pick.
St. Louis previously acquired this pick as the result of a trade on September 24, 2019, that sent Joel Edmundson, Dominik Bokk and a seventh-round pick in 2021 to Carolina in exchange for Justin Faulk and this pick.
 The Philadelphia Flyers' fifth-round pick went to the Tampa Bay Lightning as the result of a trade on October 7, 2020, that sent Detroit's fourth-round pick in 2020 (94th overall) to Philadelphia in exchange for a fourth-round pick in 2020 (116th overall) and this pick.
 The Colorado Avalanche's fifth-round pick went to the Pittsburgh Penguins as the result of a trade on October 7, 2020, that sent a fifth-round pick in 2020 (139th overall) to Colorado in exchange for a seventh-round pick in 2020 (211th overall) and this pick.
 The Vegas Golden Knights' fifth-round pick went to the Florida Panthers as the result of a trade on October 7, 2020, that sent Toronto's fifth-round pick in 2020 (137th overall) to Toronto in exchange for St. Louis' seventh-round pick in 2020 (212th overall) and this pick.
Toronto previously acquired this pick as the result of a trade on February 24, 2020, that sent Robin Lehner to Vegas in exchange for this pick.
 The Tampa Bay Lightning's fifth-round pick went to the Ottawa Senators as the result of a trade on July 30, 2019, that sent Mike Condon and a sixth-round pick in 2020 to Tampa Bay in exchange for Ryan Callahan and this pick.

Round six

Notes
 The Ottawa Senators' sixth-round pick went to the Tampa Bay Lightning as the result of a trade on July 30, 2019, that sent Ryan Callahan and a fifth-round pick in 2020 to Ottawa in exchange for Mike Condon and this pick.
 The San Jose Sharks' sixth-round pick went to the Ottawa Senators as the result of a trade on June 19, 2018, that sent Mike Hoffman, Cody Donaghey and a fifth-round pick in 2020 to San Jose in exchange for Mikkel Boedker, Julius Bergman and this pick.
 The Los Angeles Kings' sixth-round pick went to the Carolina Hurricanes as the result of a trade on October 7, 2020, that sent Montreal's fifth-round pick in 2020 (140th overall) to Los Angeles in exchange for a seventh-round pick in 2021 and this pick.
 The Buffalo Sabres' sixth-round pick went to the Dallas Stars as the result of a trade on February 24, 2020, that sent Emil Djuse to Florida in exchange for this pick.
Florida previously acquired this pick as the result of a trade on June 30, 2019, that sent James Reimer to Carolina in exchange for Scott Darling and this pick.
Carolina previously acquired this pick as the result of a trade on August 2, 2018, that sent Jeff Skinner to Buffalo in exchange for Cliff Pu, a second-round pick in 2019, a third-round pick in 2020 and this pick.
 The Minnesota Wild's sixth-round pick went to the St. Louis Blues as the result of a trade on October 7, 2020, that sent Carolina's fifth-round pick in 2020 (146th overall) to Minnesota in exchange for a seventh-round pick in 2020 (194th overall) and this pick.
 The Florida Panthers' sixth-round pick went to the Colorado Avalanche as the result of a trade on February 25, 2019, that sent a third-round pick in 2020 to Florida in exchange for Derick Brassard and this pick (being conditional at the time of the trade). The condition - Colorado will receive a sixth-round pick in 2020 if Brassard does not re-sign with the Avalanche for the 2019–20 NHL season - was converted on August 21, 2019, when Brassard signed with the New York Islanders.
 The Carolina Hurricanes' sixth-round pick went to the Toronto Maple Leafs as the result of a trade on June 22, 2019, that sent Patrick Marleau, a conditional first-round pick in 2020 and a seventh-round pick in 2020 to Carolina in exchange for this pick.
 The Colorado Avalanche's sixth-round pick went to the Toronto Maple Leafs as the result of a trade on July 1, 2019, that sent Nazem Kadri, Calle Rosen and a third-round pick in 2020 to Colorado in exchange for Tyson Barrie, Alexander Kerfoot and this pick.
 The St. Louis Blues' sixth-round pick went to the Ottawa Senators as the result of a trade on November 22, 2018, that sent Chris Wideman to Edmonton in exchange for this pick.
Edmonton previously acquired this pick in a trade on October 1, 2018, that sent Jakub Jerabek to St. Louis in exchange for this pick (being conditional at the time of the trade). The condition – Edmonton will receive a sixth-round pick in 2020 if Jerabek plays in less than 50 games during the 2018–19 NHL season – was converted on December 22, 2018.

Round seven

Notes
 The Ottawa Senators' seventh-round pick went to the Chicago Blackhawks as the result of a trade on October 7, 2020, that sent Montreal's seventh-round pick in 2021 to Montreal in exchange for this pick.
Montreal previously acquired this pick as the result of a trade on February 24, 2020, that sent Matthew Peca to Ottawa in exchange for Aaron Luchuk and this pick.
 The San Jose Sharks' seventh-round pick went to the Toronto Maple Leafs as the result of a trade on February 20, 2018, that sent Eric Fehr to San Jose in exchange for this pick.
 The Anaheim Ducks' seventh-round pick went to the Vancouver Canucks as the result of a trade on January 16, 2019, that sent Michael Del Zotto to Anaheim in exchange for Luke Schenn and this pick.
 The New Jersey Devils' seventh-round pick went to the Arizona Coyotes as the result of a trade on October 7, 2020, that sent a seventh-round pick in 2021 to New Jersey in exchange for this pick.
 The Minnesota Wild's seventh-round pick went to the St. Louis Blues as the result of a trade on October 7, 2020, that sent Carolina's fifth-round pick in 2020 (146th overall) to Minnesota in exchange for a sixth-round pick in 2020 (163rd overall) and this pick.
 The Winnipeg Jets' seventh-round pick went to the Toronto Maple Leafs as the result of a trade on May 30, 2019, that sent Fedor Gordeev to Minnesota in exchange for this pick (being conditional at the time of the trade). The condition – Toronto will receive Winnipeg's seventh-round pick in 2020 if Gordeev signs with the Wild before June 1, 2019 – was converted on May 30, 2019.
Minnesota previously acquired this pick as the result of a trade on February 25, 2019, that sent Matt Hendricks to Winnipeg in exchange for this pick.
 The New York Rangers' seventh-round pick went to the San Jose Sharks as the result of a trade on October 7, 2020, that sent a fifth-round pick in 2020 (127th overall) to New York in exchange for Vancouver's seventh-round pick in 2020 (206th overall) and this pick.
 The Nashville Predators' seventh-round pick went to the New York Rangers as the result of a trade on February 6, 2019, that sent Cody McLeod to Nashville in exchange for this pick.
 The Toronto Maple Leafs' seventh-round pick went to the Carolina Hurricanes as the result of a trade on June 22, 2019, that sent a sixth-round pick in 2020 to Toronto in exchange for Patrick Marleau, a conditional first-round pick in 2020 and this pick.
 The Pittsburgh Penguins' seventh-round pick went to the San Jose Sharks as the result of a trade on June 22, 2019, that sent a seventh-round pick in 2019 to Pittsburgh in exchange for this pick.
 The Montreal Canadiens' seventh-round pick went to the Nashville Predators as the result of a trade on October 7, 2020, that sent a fifth-round pick in 2020 (135th overall) to Philadelphia in exchange for a seventh-round pick in 2020 (209th overall) and this pick.
Philadelphia previously acquired this pick as the result of a trade on June 22, 2019, that sent Montreal's seventh-round pick in 2019 to Montreal in exchange for this pick.
 The Chicago Blackhawks' seventh-round pick went to the Detroit Red Wings as the result of a trade on October 7, 2020, that sent a seventh-round pick in 2021 to St. Louis in exchange for this pick.
St. Louis previously acquired this pick as the result of a trade on September 2, 2020, that sent Jake Allen and a seventh-round pick in 2022 to Montreal in exchange for Washington's third-round pick in 2020 and this pick.
Montreal previously acquired this pick as the result of a trade on June 30, 2019, that sent Andrew Shaw and a seventh-round pick in 2021 to Chicago in exchange for a second-round pick in 2020, a third-round pick in 2021 and this pick.
 The Vancouver Canucks' seventh-round pick went to the San Jose Sharks as the result of a trade on October 7, 2020, that sent a fifth-round pick in 2020 (127th overall) to the New York Rangers in exchange for a seventh-round pick in 2020 (196th overall) and this pick.
The Rangers previously acquired this pick as the result of a trade on February 12, 2019, that sent Marek Mazanec to Vancouver in exchange for this pick.
 The Columbus Blue Jackets' seventh-round pick went to the Anaheim Ducks as the result of a trade on October 7, 2020, that sent a conditional seventh-round pick in 2022 or 2023 to Columbus in exchange for this pick.
 The Philadelphia Flyers' seventh-round pick went to the Nashville Predators as the result of a trade on October 7, 2020, that sent a fifth-round pick in 2020 (135th overall) to Philadelphia in exchange for Montreal's seventh-round pick in 2020 (202nd overall) and this pick.
 The Washington Capitals' seventh-round pick went to the San Jose Sharks as the result of a trade on June 22, 2019, that sent a fifth-round pick in 2019 to Washington in exchange for a seventh-round pick in 2019 and this pick.
 The Colorado Avalanche's fifth-round pick went to the Washington Capitals as the result of a trade on October 7, 2020, that sent a seventh-round pick in 2021 to Pittsburgh in exchange for this pick.
Pittsburgh previously acquired this pick as the result of a trade on October 7, 2020, that sent a fifth-round pick in 2020 (139th overall) to Colorado in exchange for a fifth-round pick in 2020 (149th overall) and this pick.
 The St. Louis Blues' seventh-round pick went to the Florida Panthers as the result of a trade on October 7, 2020, that sent Toronto's fifth-round pick in 2020 (137th overall) to Toronto in exchange for Vegas' fifth-round pick in 2020 (153rd overall) and this pick.
Toronto previously acquired this pick as the result of a trade on June 22, 2019, that sent a seventh-round pick in 2019 to St. Louis in exchange for this pick.
 The Boston Bruins' seventh-round pick went to the Toronto Maple Leafs as the result of a trade on October 7, 2020, that sent a seventh-round pick in 2021 to Boston in exchange for this pick.
 The Dallas Stars' seventh-round pick went to the Buffalo Sabres as the result of a trade on November 10, 2018, that sent Taylor Fedun to Dallas in exchange for this pick (being conditional at the time of the trade). The condition – Buffalo will receive a seventh-round pick in 2020 if Fedun plays in 25 games during the 2018–19 NHL season and 2019 Stanley Cup playoffs combined – was converted on January 17, 2019.

Draftees based on nationality

North American draftees by state/province

See also
 2016–17 NHL transactions
 2017–18 NHL transactions
 2018–19 NHL transactions
 2019–20 NHL transactions
 2020–21 NHL transactions
 2020–21 NHL season
 List of first overall NHL draft picks
 List of NHL players

References

External links
2020 NHL Entry Draft player stats at The Internet Hockey Database

NHL Entry Draft
NHL Entry Draft
Entry Draft
Ice hockey in New Jersey
National Hockey League Entry Draft
National Hockey League in the New York metropolitan area
NHL Entry Draft
NHL